Talit  is a  railway  station on the Bardhaman–Asansol section. It is located at Talit near Bardhaman, Purba Bardhaman district in the Indian state of West Bengal. Total 42 trains including 13 passengers trains and few MEMU stops in Talit railway station.

References

Railway stations in Purba Bardhaman district
Howrah railway division